University of Northern Bahr el Ghazal (UNBEG) is a university in South Sudan.

Location
The university is located in the city of Aweil, in Aweil Central County, Northern State, in the Bahr el Ghazal Region, in northwestern South Sudan, near the International border with the Republic of Sudan.

History
The university was established in 2011, as a government-supported institution of higher education, to address the educational requirements of the following communities in the following order: (a) Northern Bahr el Ghazal State (b) Bahr el Ghazal Region (c) Southern Sudan (d) Interested Qualified International Students. The first class of students was expected to begin classes in October 2011.

Overview
Rumbek University scheduled to open its doors in October 2011. The first Vice Chancellor of the university is Professor John Apuruot Akec. The university is a public university. The list of public universities in the country includes the following:

 Juba National University in Juba; 1977
 Rumbek University in Rumbek; 2010
 Upper Nile University in Malakal; 1991
 University of Bahr El-Ghazal in Wau and
 University of Northern Bahr El-Ghazal in Aweil; 2011

External links
 Location of Aweil At Google Maps
Detailed History of Aweil & Surrounding Communities

See also
 Aweil
 Northern Bahr el Ghazal
 Bahr el Ghazal
 Education in South Sudan
 List of universities in South Sudan

References

Universities in South Sudan
Northern Bahr el Ghazal
Bahr el Ghazal
2011 establishments in South Sudan